So Yiu Man (born 9 November 1977 in Hong Kong) is a professional football player who plays for Tuen Mun of Hong Kong First Division League as a midfielder. His nickname is "Siu-Cheun".

Honours
With South China
 Hong Kong Senior Shield: 2001–02, 2002–03
 Hong Kong League Cup: 2001–02
With Eastern
 Hong Kong Senior Shield: 2007–08

Career statistics

Club career
As of 26 October 2009

Notes and references

External links
So Yiu Man at HKFA

1977 births
Living people
Hong Kong footballers
Association football midfielders
South China AA players
Citizen AA players
Happy Valley AA players
Eastern Sports Club footballers
Sun Hei SC players
Hong Kong First Division League players